There have been two baronetcies created for the Onslow family, one in the Baronetage of England and one in the Baronetage of Great Britain. Both titles are still extant.

The Onslow baronetcy, of West Clandon in the County of Surrey, was created in the Baronetage of England on 8 May 1674 for Arthur Onslow, with the precedence of 1660. The second Baronet was created Baron Onslow in 1716 and the fourth Baron was created Earl of Onslow in 1801. For more information on this creation, see the latter title.

The Onslow baronetcy, of Althain in the County of Lancaster, was created in the Baronetage of Great Britain on 30 October 1797 for the naval commander Admiral Sir Richard Onslow. The title was awarded in recognition of his services at the Battle of Camperdown where he was second in command. Onslow was the second son of Lieutenant-General Richard Onslow, nephew of the first Baron Onslow and uncle of the first Earl of Onslow. The present holder of the baronetcy is also in remainder to the Onslow baronetcy of West Clandon and in special remainder to the barony of Onslow.

Onslow baronets, of West Clandon (1674)
see the Earl of Onslow

Onslow baronets, of Althain (1797)
Sir Richard Onslow, 1st Baronet (1741–1817)
Sir Henry Onslow, 2nd Baronet (1784–1853)
Sir Henry Onslow, 3rd Baronet (1809–1870)
Sir Matthew Richard Onslow, 4th Baronet (1810–1876)
Sir William Wallace Rhoderic Onslow, 5th Baronet (1845–1916)
Sir Roger Warin Beaconsfield Onslow, 6th Baronet (1880–1931)
Sir Richard Wilmot Onslow, 7th Baronet (1906–1963)
Sir John Roger Wilmot Onslow, 8th Baronet (1932–2009)
Sir Richard Paul Atherton Onslow, 9th Baronet (born 1958)

Notes

References
Kidd, Charles, Williamson, David (editors). Debrett's Peerage and Baronetage (1990 edition). New York: St Martin's Press, 1990, 

Baronetcies in the Baronetage of Great Britain
1674 establishments in England
1797 establishments in Great Britain
Baronetcies in the Baronetage of England